The Kyaikthanlan Pagoda is the tallest Buddhist pagoda in Mawlamyine, Mon State, Myanmar, standing at a height of .

In 1764 (1125 ME), General Maha Nawrahta of the Royal Burmese Army repaired the pagoda but couldn't finish it. In 1831, to prevent Moulmein's identity from fading away, Sitke Maung Htaw Lay, who later served as Magistrate of Moulmein restored the pagoda with the funds raised by public subscriptions. Situated on the range of hill, the pagoda commands views of the city, nearby islands, Gulf of Martaban, surrounding rivers and the limestone mountains of Kayin State in the east. Rudyard Kipling is believed to have written his famous "Lookin' lazy at the sea" line from "The Road to Mandalay" poem at this pagoda.

See also
 Buddhism in Myanmar
 Kaylartha Pagoda
 Kyaikhtisaung Pagoda
 Kyaik Ne Yay Lae Pagoda
 Kyaiktiyo Pagoda
 Pa-Auk Forest Monastery
 Yadanabonmyint Monastery
 Zinkyaik Pagoda

References

Buddhist temples in Myanmar
Buildings and structures in Mon State
Mawlamyine
9th-century Buddhist temples
Religious buildings and structures completed in 875